Laryngeal consonants (a term often used interchangeably with guttural consonants) are consonants with their primary articulation in the larynx. The laryngeal consonants comprise the pharyngeal consonants (including the epiglottals), the glottal consonants, and for some languages uvular consonants.

The term laryngeal is often taken to be synonymous with glottal, but the larynx consists of more than just the glottis (vocal folds): it also includes the epiglottis and aryepiglottic folds.  In a broad sense, therefore, laryngeal articulations include the radical consonants, which involve the root of the tongue.  The diversity of sounds produced in the larynx is the subject of ongoing research, and the terminology is evolving.

The term laryngeal consonant is also used for laryngealized consonants articulated in the upper vocal tract, such as Arabic 'emphatics' and Korean 'tense' consonants.

See also
Laryngeal theory (in Proto-Indo-European phonology)
Place of articulation
Index of phonetics articles

References

Miller, Amanda (2005), "Guttural vowels and guttural co-articulation in Ju|’hoansi". Journal of Phonetics, vol. 35, Issue 1, January 2007, pp 56–84.

Place of articulation